Whitefriar Street Carmelite Church is a Roman Catholic church in Dublin, Ireland maintained by the Carmelite order. The church is noted for having the relics of Saint Valentine, which were donated to the church in the 19th century by Pope Gregory XVI from their previous location in the cemetery of St. Hippolytus in Rome.

The church is on the site of a pre-Reformation Carmelite priory built in 1539. The current structure dates from 1825 and was designed by George Papworth, who also designed St. Mary's Pro-Cathedral in Dublin. It was extended and enlarged in 1856 and 1868.

The church also contains relics of St. Albert, a Sicilian who died in 1306. On his feast day (7 August), a relic of the saint is dipped into the water of St. Albert's Well, and the Carmelites say that those who piously use the water receive healing of both body and mind through the intercession of St. Albert.

The church also contains a life-size oak figure of Our Lady of Dublin.

References

External links
Whitefriar Street Church website

Churches of the Roman Catholic Archdiocese of Dublin
Carmelite churches
Roman Catholic churches in Dublin (city)